Stephen Anthony Holland  (born 30 April 1970) is an English football coach who is the assistant manager to Gareth Southgate with the England national team.

Playing career
As a schoolboy, Holland progressed through the academy at Derby County until his late teens, when, after a bad injury, he was told that he would not be kept on. He had short stints playing professional football for Bury and for Husqvarna FF of Sweden and semi-pro for Northwich Victoria and Hyde United but, aged 21, Holland decided to go into coaching.

Coaching career
Holland was appointed as a youth coach at Crewe Alexandra in 1992, aged 22 by Dario Gradi, who had coached Holland as a schoolboy. Holland had successfully completed the FA Full Coaching Licence aged 22, one of the youngest recipients of the coaching award.
Holland went on to work at the club for 17 years working with young players of every age in the club's highly successful youth Academy.
Holland slowly made his way through the coaching ranks at Crewe before becoming the club's Academy Director. Holland also had a spell as first team coach during the club's successful period in the Championship.

At the start of the 2006–07 season, Gradi revealed that Holland would be involved more in the first team set-up for the season. On 20 April 2007, it was announced by the football club that Gradi would be taking up a new role as Technical Director on 1 July 2007 while Holland would be promoted to the role of First-Team Coach, whilst keeping his job as Academy Director. Gradi said that Holland was the "right man" to eventually replace him and that the move was a "gradual transition".

In July 2007 Holland completed the UEFA Pro Licence coaching award and went on to complete the LMA-PFA Certificate in applied Management at Warwick University in 2009. The move meant that Holland's role at the club was much nearer to being a manager rather than a coach. He left this role on 18 November 2008 and was replaced by former manager Dario Gradi, after which he held talks with the club to decide his future there. In December 2008, it was reported that Holland would be leaving Crewe. In March 2009, he was appointed manager of the youth academy at nearby Stoke City.

On 12 August 2009, Holland was named the reserve team manager for Chelsea. In May 2011 Holland won the Premier Reserve League beating Blackburn in the Play-Off Final at Stamford Bridge for the first time since 1994.

On 29 June 2011, it was announced that Holland would become assistant first team coach at Chelsea under new manager André Villas-Boas. When Villas-Boas was dismissed on 4 March 2012 and Roberto Di Matteo was appointed caretaker manager of Chelsea, Holland filled the role of assistant manager. He continued in this position under the interim manager Rafael Benítez. In 2013, Holland continued in his role as assistant manager under Jose Mourinho. In December 2015, Holland took temporary charge for a Premier League fixture against Sunderland. In January 2016, Holland became Assistant Manager to Guus Hiddink for the remainder of the 2015–2016 season and in July 2016 Holland became Assistant to Antonio Conte.

In August 2013, Holland was appointed assistant manager to the new England Under 21s manager Gareth Southgate. Following the appointment of Gareth Southgate as the caretaker of the England national football team on 27 September 2016, when Sam Allardyce resigned after one game due to a corruption scandal, Holland also became assistant manager for the senior level. He left Chelsea after the 2016–2017 season ended.

After the England team reached the final of the delayed UEFA Euro 2020 in 2021, Holland was appointed Member of the Order of the British Empire (MBE) in the 2022 New Year Honours for services to association football.

References

1970 births
Living people
Footballers from Derby
English footballers
Derby County F.C. players
Bury F.C. players
Husqvarna FF players
Northwich Victoria F.C. players
English football managers
Crewe Alexandra F.C. managers
Chelsea F.C. managers
English Football League managers
Premier League managers
Association football coaches
Stoke City F.C. non-playing staff
Chelsea F.C. non-playing staff
Members of the Order of the British Empire
Association footballers not categorized by position